A certificate of legal aid costs is a British "certificate of costs allowed following taxation by a judicial or taxing officer."  It actually has nothing to do with legal aid.

It is similar to a bill of costs used in Italy, and elsewhere.

See also
 Bill of costs
 Judgment (law)
 Taxation of costs

References

Law of the United Kingdom
Legal costs